Joseph Barnes (5 May 1896 – 1953) was an English footballer who played for Rochdale when they joined the English Football League in 1921.

References

Rochdale A.F.C. players
Bacup Borough F.C. players
Colwyn Bay F.C. players
Bangor City F.C. players
English footballers
1896 births
1953 deaths
People from Hyde, Greater Manchester
Association football central defenders